A75 or A-75 may refer to:

 A75 motorway (France), a road connecting Clermont-Ferrand and Béziers
 A75 road (Scotland), a road connecting Gretna and Stranraer
 A-75 motorway (Spain), a road connecting  the A-52 motorway near Verín with the Portuguese Auto-estrada A24 near Chaves
 A75 Fusion Controller Hub, a chipset used for AMD microprocessors
 Benoni Defense, in the Encyclopaedia of Chess Openings
 Canon PowerShot A75, a digital camera made by Canon
 Toshiba Satellite A75, a laptop made by Toshiba